Wedderburn is a community in Central Otago, New Zealand. It is located 15 kilometres northwest of Ranfurly, and was at one time close to the centre of a thriving gold and coal mining area. The name of Wedderburn was given to the area by John Turnbull Thomson, and is one of the names in his infamous "Thomson's Barnyard", wedder being Northumbrian dialect form of the word wether, meaning a castrated sheep.

Wedderburn is on State Highway 85 close to the Otago Central Rail Trail. Originally a coaching stop, Wedderburn became a terminus on the Otago Central Railway in 1921 and was the headquarters for the Public Works Department during construction of this section of the line. The section through Wedderburn was eventually abandoned due to a decline in traffic.  The line was sustained during the 1980s carrying materials for the Clyde Dam, which inundated the stretch of the line between Clyde and Cromwell, but when the dam was finished, the traffic on the line was below sustainable levels and it was officially closed.

Following the closure of the railway, the Otago Excursion Train Trust and Dunedin City Council bought the track through the scenic Taieri Gorge up to Middlemarch to form the Taieri Gorge Railway Ltd. The remaining track was removed and this section became the 150 kilometres long Otago Central Rail Trail from Middlemarch to Clyde for recreational use by cyclists and walkers. This trail passes through Wedderburn and past the Wedderburn goods shed.

Artist Grahame Sydney made the Wedderburn railway goods shed famous in his 1975 painting of the shed in an austere Otago landscape representing the economic and social changes brought about by railways. The shed was subsequently removed to a site five kilometres away but later returned following public protest. The shed is now being conserved and has been restored to its recognisable green colour.

References 

Populated places in Otago